Pseudotolida is a genus of tumbling flower beetles in the family Mordellidae. There are at least 20 described species in Pseudotolida.

Species
These 23 species belong to the genus Pseudotolida:

 Pseudotolida arida (LeConte, 1862) i c g
 Pseudotolida awana (Kono, 1932) g
 Pseudotolida bicoloria Leblanc, 2014 g
 Pseudotolida boillyi Leblanc, 2014 g
 Pseudotolida callens (Champion, 1891) g
 Pseudotolida castaneicolor (Champion, 1891) g
 Pseudotolida davidi Leblanc, 2014 g
 Pseudotolida degallieri Leblanc, 2014 g
 Pseudotolida ephippiata (Champion, 1891) g
 Pseudotolida equinoctialis (Champion, 1891) g
 Pseudotolida isthmica (Champion, 1891) g
 Pseudotolida knausi (Liljeblad, 1945) i c g
 Pseudotolida lutea (Melsheimer, 1845) i c g b
 Pseudotolida morimotoi Nomura, 1967 g
 Pseudotolida multisulcata Nomura, 1966
 Pseudotolida poneli Leblanc, 2014 g
 Pseudotolida robertorum Leblanc, 2014 g
 Pseudotolida sinica Fan & Yang, 1995
 Pseudotolida tokyoensis Nomura & Kato, 1959
 Pseudotolida vafer (Champion, 1891) g
 Pseudotolida valens (Champion, 1891) g
 Pseudotolida veraepacis (Champion, 1891) g
 Pseudotolida westerduijni Leblanc, 2014 g

Data sources: i = ITIS, c = Catalogue of Life, g = GBIF, b = Bugguide.net

References

Further reading

 
 
 
 
 
 
 

Mordellidae